"Yours Truly" is a single by Blindspott released in 2005. It is the fourth track on the band's second album, End the Silence. It peaked at number nine on the New Zealand singles chart.

Track listing
"Yours Truly (Radio Edit)"
"Yours Truly (Alternate Ending)"
"Yours Truly (MPEG Video)"

References

2005 singles
Blindspott songs